The 2009 Destination X was a professional wrestling pay-per-view (PPV) event produced by Total Nonstop Action Wrestling (TNA), which took place on March 15, 2009, at the TNA Impact Zone in Orlando, Florida. It was the fifth event under the Destination X chronology.

In October 2017, with the launch of the Global Wrestling Network, the event became available to stream on demand.

Storylines

Destination X featured nine  professional wrestling matches that involved different wrestlers from pre-existing scripted feuds and storylines. Wrestlers portrayed villains, heroes, or less distinguishable characters in the scripted events that built tension and culminated in a wrestling match or series of matches.

Results

References

External links
Destination X at In Demand.com
TNA Wrestling.com

Destination X
2009 in professional wrestling in Florida
Professional wrestling shows in Orlando, Florida
March 2009 events in the United States
2009 Total Nonstop Action Wrestling pay-per-view events